Northern Iran consists of the southern border of the Caspian Sea and the Alborz mountains.

It includes the provinces of Gilan, Mazandaran, and Golestan. (Ancient kingdom of Hyrcania, medieval region of Tabaristan). The major provinces, Gilan and Mazandaran, are covered with dense forests, snow-covered mountains and impressive sea shores.

The major cities are Rasht, Gorgan, Sâri, Bâbol, Amol, Qaem Shahr, Gonbad-e Kavus, Anzali, Lahijan, and Behshahr. Northern Iran has numerous villages, particularly Massulé, appreciated by travellers.

Northern Iran was a trendy spot during the Pahlavi era, especially among foreign tourists. It was a luxurious place that provided all types of modern recreational facilities as well as tourism infrastructure. Today, it's mostly visited by domestic tourists.

Language 
Iran is a very diverse country. "Dialect wise" there are different sub-languages and dialects of native speakers in the north of Iran as well the rest of the country. From the east to the west there are five major languages and hundreds of local dialects. If you talk to a native Iranian "north of Iran" are only the provinces on the south side of Caspian Sea which are Gilān, Māzandarān and Golestān, the last one has been separated from Māzandarān province at 1997. Here is the map of Iran with its provinces. Despite Iranian opinion of the north of Iran, Khorāsan at the east and the two Āzerbāijāns at the west side of Iran are geographically at the north of Iran, therefore, their languages have been included in this article.

From the northeast, Khorāsan which is a large province laid out from the north to the middle south of Iran and is a neighbor to the Afghanistan border. The language from the north to the south of this province changes drastically, In the north of Khorāsan people speak “Ghaz Turkish” going from the north to the middle of the province, the dialect changes to some sort of Arabic which belonged to an old Iraqi Arabic language. This language has been mixed drastically with Persian language which makes it impossible for an Arab speaker to understand it. There are some Kurdish speakers in the north of khorāsan as well. The current languages of Khorāsan.

From the north of Iran heading to the west, the next province is Golestān which has its own diversity in languages. until 1997 Golestān was a part of Māzandarān province. The main languages from the east to the west in this province are Turkmen, Turkish and then Māzandarāni which is among the oldest written languages of the country. Māzandarāni

Māzandarān is the neighboring province which has the language of Māzandarāni all over the province which has over tens of different dialects in different regions., almost all of them are sub categories of Māzandarāni. Native people of Māzandarān call themselves Tabari and their language Tabari. The name Tapuri / Tabari (which was the name of an ancient language spoken somewhere in former Tapuria) is now used in preference to the name Mazandarani by the young. The earliest references to the language of Mazandaran, called Tabari, are to be found in the works of the early Muslim geographers. Al-Muqaddasī (or Moqaisi, 10th century), for example, notes: "The languages of Komish and Gurgan are similar, they use hā,  as in hā-dih and hāk-un, and they are sweet [to the ear], related to them is the language of Tabaristan, [similar] save for its speediness."

The next province is Gilān, people of Gilān have three major languages: Gelaki, Rudbāri and Tāleshi with some other old languages which are spoken in small region on Gilān only. In the western side of Gilān people speak some sort of Gelaki which is heavily mixed with Āzari Turkish, the language of the neighboring province.

After Gilān in the northwest of Iran, there are two Āzerbāijān provinces, the east and west ones, the main language is Āzari Turkish which is native language to the people of these provinces.

Majority of young generations of Iranian, in all over the country, are able to speak, read, and write Persian, which is a national language of the country and they learn it in schools.

Climate
Cold semi-arid climate: the high mountains and northern parts of the Alborz range. In the heights, the weather is cold mountainous and most of the precipitation is in the form of snow.
Humid subtropical climate: covering central and western plains of Mazandaran and the province of Gilān. The average annual rainfall amounts to 1200 or 1300 or even up to 1830 mm, and as we proceed to the east the amount decreases.

See also
 Northwestern Iran
 Western Iran
 Eastern Iran
 Central Iran
 Southern Iran

References

Subdivisions of Iran